is a former Japanese football player.

Club career
Osawa was born in Sayama on October 22, 1984. After graduating from high school, he joined Omiya Ardija in 2003. However he could hardly play in the match and he moved to Japan Football League club Sagawa Express Tokyo (later Sagawa Shiga) in 2006. He played many matches from first season and became a regular player from 2008 season. However the club was disbanded end of 2012 season, he moved to Kamatamare Sanuki in 2013. He played as regular player and the club was promoted to J2 League end of 2013 season. However his opportunity to play decreased from 2014 and he retired end of 2017 season.

National team career
In September 2001, he was selected Japan U-17 national team for 2001 U-17 World Championship. He played 1 match against France as substitutes.

Club statistics

1Includes J3 Relegation Playoffs.

References

External links

1984 births
Living people
Association football people from Saitama Prefecture
Japanese footballers
Japan youth international footballers
J1 League players
J2 League players
Japan Football League players
Omiya Ardija players
Sagawa Shiga FC players
Kamatamare Sanuki players
Association football midfielders